Kamalganj railway station is located in Farukhabad district, Uttar Pradesh state, India. It serves Kamalganj town. Its code is KLJ. It has two platforms.

References 

Railway stations in Uttar Pradesh
Railway stations in Farrukhabad district